Signa A. Daum Shanks is an Indigenous Law scholar from Saskatchewan. She is a professor at the Osgoode Hall Law School in Toronto, Canada. She teaches Torts, Indigenous governance and history. Her research is concerned with Law and Economics, and Indigenous Governance. She serves as a board member and is the Secretary of the Ontario Bar Association.

Education 
Daum Shanks obtained a Honours Bachelor of Arts from the University of Saskatchewan and a Master of Arts from Western University in history. During her MA she received training in French translation as well as the eighteenth century legal system in New France. She obtained an LLB from Osgoode in 1999, and an LLM from the University of Toronto.  She has a PhD in History from the Western University. Daum Shanks articled at Saskatchewan Justice and clerked at the Land Claims Court of South Africa. She participated in Osgoode’s Intensive Program in Aboriginal Lands, Resources and Governments.

Career 
Daum Shanks has been a faculty member at the School of Native Studies at the University of Alberta and also an instructor at Department of Native Studies, the University of Saskatchewan and at First Nations University of Canada. She is a faculty member at Osgoode Law School at York University in Toronto from 2014.

She is a frequent commentator in the media on topics related to Indigenous peoples in North American, writing on diverse topics such as reconciliation pipelines and Indigenous rights, and the use of Indigenous images in sports.

In February 2021 Daum Shanks was appointed to the Independent Advisory Board for Supreme Court of Canada Judicial Appointments.

Publications

References 

Canadian Métis people
Living people
Canadian indigenous women academics
Year of birth missing (living people)
Métis academics
Indigenous studies in Canada
Canadian legal scholars
Canadian women historians
21st-century Canadian historians